St. Francis Xavier Cathedral may refer to:

Australia
 St Francis Xavier's Cathedral, Adelaide
 St Francis Xavier's Cathedral, Geraldton
 St Francis Xavier's Cathedral, Wollongong

Bahamas
 St. Francis Xavier Cathedral, Nassau

Belarus
 St. Francis Xavier Cathedral, Grodno

Canada
 St Francis Xavier Cathedral, Chicoutimi

India
St. Francis Xavier Cathedral, Agartala
St. Francis Xavier's Cathedral, Bangalore
St. Francis Xavier's Cathedral, Kottar

Indonesia
 St. Francis Xavier Cathedral, Ambon

Japan
St. Francis Xavier Cathedral, Kagoshima
St. Francis Xavier Cathedral, Kyoto

Pakistan
St. Francis Xavier Cathedral, Hyderabad

Philippines
 St. Francis Xavier Cathedral, Kabankalan

Slovakia
St. Francis Xavier Cathedral (Banská Bystrica, Slovakia)

United States
St. Francis Xavier Cathedral (Alexandria, Louisiana),  Louisiana
St. Francis Xavier Cathedral and Library, Indiana
Saint Francis Xavier Cathedral (Green Bay, Wisconsin)

See also
St. Francis Xavier Church (disambiguation)